This is a list of episodes from the first season of Shark Tank.

Episodes

Kevin Harrington, Daymond John, Kevin O'Leary, Barbara Corcoran, and Robert Herjavec appear as the sharks in every episode this season.

References

External links 
 Official website
 

1
2009 American television seasons
2010 American television seasons